Marcus Wayne Buckley  (born February 3, 1971) is a former American college and professional football player who was a linebacker in the National Football League (NFL) for seven seasons during the 1990s.  He played college football for Texas A&M University, and was honored as an All-American.  He played his entire pro career for the New York Giants.

Early years
Buckley was born in Fort Worth, Texas.  He graduated from Eastern Hills High School in Fort Worth, where he played for the Eastern Hills Highlanders high school football team.

College football
Buckley accepted an athletic scholarship to attend Texas A&M University, and played for the Texas A&M Aggies football team from 1989 to 1992.  He was recognized as a consensus first-team All-American at linebacker in 1992.

Professional career
In seven NFL seasons, he played in 101 regular season games for the Giants, started 25 of them, and compiled 137 tackles. He was on the Atlanta Falcons 2000 roster, but played no games.

On January 25, 2018, after an investigation by the FBI for ties to a $1.5 million insurance fraud scheme, Buckley was sentenced to 24 months in federal prison. On April 10, 2013 he was indicted and charged with insurance fraud along with a co-conspirator, Kimberly Jones. The charges allege that Buckley made false workers compensation claims related to stress-related injuries from playing football.

References

1971 births
Living people
All-American college football players
American football linebackers
New York Giants players
Sportspeople from Fort Worth, Texas
Texas A&M Aggies football players
Atlanta Falcons players